The 1944 United States presidential election in Nevada took place on November 7, 1944, as part of the 1944 United States presidential election. State voters chose three representatives, or electors, to the Electoral College, who voted for president and vice president.

Nevada was won by incumbent President Franklin D. Roosevelt (D–New York), running with Senator Harry S. Truman, with 54.62% of the popular vote, against Governor Thomas E. Dewey (R–New York), running with Governor John W. Bricker, with 45.38% of the popular vote.

Results

Results by county

See also
United States presidential elections in Nevada

References

Nevada
1944
1944 Nevada elections